Viktor Leonidovich Bedrik is a Russian military officer, currently serving as military head of the Kherson military-civilian administration. He holds the rank of colonel.

Career 
In 2022, he took part in the 2022 Russian invasion of Ukraine. In early March, he was appointed Military Commandant of the occupied Kherson Oblast.

References 

Living people
Russian military personnel of the 2022 Russian invasion of Ukraine
Year of birth missing (living people)